Chariya Nuya (born 25 October 1987) is a Thai racing driver currently competing in the TCR International Series and TCR Thailand Touring Car Championship.

Racing career
Nuya began his career in 2016 in the TCR Thailand Touring Car Championship, driving a Honda Civic TCR for Billionaire Boys Racing, he took his first victory in his first race in the series' Am class. For the 2017 season he stayed in the TCR Thailand Touring Car Championship, driving an updated Honda Civic Type-R TCR still run by Billionaire Boys Racing. He has taken four victories so far this season.

In August 2017 it was announced that he would race in the TCR International Series, driving a Honda Civic Type-R TCR for his TCR Thailand team Billionaire Boys Racing.

Racing record

Complete TCR International Series results
(key) (Races in bold indicate pole position) (Races in italics indicate fastest lap)

† Driver did not finish the race, but was classified as he completed over 90% of the race distance.
* Season still in progress.

References

External links
 

1987 births
Living people
TCR International Series drivers
Chariya Nuya
24H Series drivers
TCR Asia Series drivers